Stuart John Laughton (born August 19, 1951 in St. Catharines, Ontario) is a Canadian musician. He is Founder and Artistic Director of The Forest Festival in Ontario's Haliburton Forest and Wildlife Reserve.

In his youth, Laughton studied trumpet with Joseph Umbrico in Toronto and became one of the original members of the Canadian Brass in 1970 at the age of 19. Laughton left the group to continue his studies with Gilbert Johnson at the Curtis Institute of Music in Philadelphia. In 1973, while still a student at Curtis, Laughton was appointed principal trumpet of La Scala Opera, by Claudio Abbado.

Returning to Canada, Laughton established a reputation as a trumpet concerto soloist (with the Toronto Symphony Orchestra, Winnipeg Symphony Orchestra, Les Violons du Roy, Esprit Orchestra) and chamber musician (Laughton & Humphreys, Laughton & O'Meara, True North Brass).

Laughton founded Opening Day Recordings in 1993 as a means of promoting Canadian music and musicians such as pianist Janina Fialkowska, harpist Judy Loman, composer R. Murray Schafer, soprano Mary Lou Fallis and the Hannaford Street Silver Band with conductor Bramwell Tovey. Six of the twenty discs he released were nominated for Canadian Juno Awards.

After a 32-year absence, Laughton rejoined Canadian Brass in 2003, performing and recording with the ensemble over a two and one-half year period. During this time he also released a solo recording entitled "Remembrance" on the Marquis Classics label.

Laughton was a long-time board member (and twice president) of R. Murray Schafer's Patria Music/Theatre Projects. Schafer dedicated his composition The Falcon's Trumpet (Concerto for Trumpet and Orchestra) to Laughton; the work was commissioned and premiered by Toronto's Esprit Orchestra.

Laughton's lifelong interest in roots and blues music resulted in his founding the band Porkbelly Futures, in which he performed on lead guitar, harmonica, mandolin, lap and pedal steel guitar and (latterly) harmony vocals; the group's recordings also list Laughton on tin whistle, saxophones and trombone. Porkbelly Futures toured Canada and released three CDs which have included Laughton compositions such as Louisiana (with Martin Worthy), Deep Deep Blue (with Paul Quarrington), Alberta Springtime and March Storm.

Laughton has recently begun performing as a solo singer and multi-instrumentalist (radiodial.ca). He lives in Burlington, Ontario with his wife, a family physician (formerly a professional ballet dancer).  They have three grown children.

External links
 Opening Day Recordings

1951 births
Canadian classical musicians
Canadian trumpeters
Male trumpeters
Living people
Musicians from St. Catharines
21st-century trumpeters
21st-century Canadian male musicians